Harbance Singh (Herb) Dhaliwal, PC (born December 12, 1952) is a Canadian politician and businessman.

He was first elected to the House of Commons of Canada in the 1993 election as the Liberal Member of Parliament (MP) for Vancouver South.

Prime Minister Jean Chrétien recommended Dhaliwal's appointment to Cabinet (the first Indian-Canadian to become a federal cabinet minister) in 1997 as Minister of Revenue. In 1999, he became Minister of Fisheries and Oceans, and in 2002 he was appointed Minister of Natural Resources and Minister with political responsibility for British Columbia.

Dhaliwal was a firm supporter of Chrétien against Paul Martin's attempt to force the Liberal leader to retire. As a result, Martin's campaign team targeted Dhaliwal and successfully took over his riding association. Dhaliwal publicly denounced Martin's campaign team for this and criticized them for restricting access to Liberal Party membership forms. 
When Chrétien announced his resignation, Dhaliwal briefly considered running in the 2003 Liberal leadership campaign, but decided against it. Several months later, he endorsed Martin for leader and said he would be willing to serve in a Martin cabinet. However, on December 3, 2003, he announced that he would not be running for re-election.

Business 
After graduating from the University of British Columbia with a Bachelor of Commerce degree, he started a maintenance company out of his basement. He is a top level executive of Dynamic Facility Services Ltd. He became a self-made millionaire with diversified business interests including transportation, maintenance and real estate development.

Dhaliwal is chairman of National Green Biomed Ltd., a medical marijuana producer that donated $1 million in 2015 for health research into medical cannabis at the University of British Columbia. He spoke about decriminalization of cannabis by the Justin Trudeau federal government.

Personal life 
Born in India at Chaheru, Distt. Kapurthala Punjab in 1952, Dhaliwal's family emigrated to Vancouver when he was six. He attended John Oliver Secondary School, graduating in 1972.

Dhaliwal is married to one Amrit Kaur. He has two daughters and a son.

Election results

References

External links
 
 Personal site
 Federal Parliament Biography - The Honourable Herb Dhaliwal

Living people
Businesspeople from Vancouver
Canadian real estate businesspeople
Canadian Sikhs
Canadian transportation businesspeople
Indian emigrants to Canada
Liberal Party of Canada MPs
Members of the 26th Canadian Ministry
Members of the House of Commons of Canada from British Columbia
Members of the King's Privy Council for Canada
Mining ministers of Canada
People from Punjab, India
Politicians from Vancouver
Punjabi people
UBC Sauder School of Business alumni
Canadian politicians of Punjabi descent
1952 births